Tamsen Fadal (born ) is an American journalist, news anchor at WPIX in New York City and author of The New Single: Finding, Fixing and Falling Back In Love With Yourself. She is host/executive producer of The Broadway Show. Fadal is an advocate for midlife women's health and is a popular TikTok creator who shares her experiences as a woman over 50 in menopause.

Early life and education
Fadal was born in Concord, Massachusetts. She graduated from the University of South Florida in 1992 with a Bachelor of Arts degree in journalism. Fadal is of Lebanese descent. Her cousin is actress Shannon Elizabeth.

Career
Fadal began her broadcasting career as a morning anchor for WHNZ Radio in Tampa, Florida. In 2002, she traveled to Afghanistan with the American troops reporting on the war. Fadal reported for WPGH-TV in Pittsburgh, Pennsylvania, WFTV in Orlando, Florida and WOWK-TV in Charleston, West Virginia and KYW-TV in Philadelphia. In 2004, she joined WCBS in New York City, and she joined WPIX on March 24, 2008, reporting and anchoring for the Morning News five days a week, covering breaking news as well as feature stories.

Fadal co-starred in the 2009 docu-series, "Matched In Manhattan" on Lifetime (TV Network) as a dating coach to clients.

In 2019, Fadal became the host and executive producer of Broadway Profiles for The Broadway Channel, a monthly series featuring in-depth interviews with celebrities as well as an inside look at the Broadway industry  The show began airing weekly in fall 2020, when it became the first program about Broadway to be nationally syndicated. In September 2021, the show's name changed to The Broadway Show with Tamsen Fadal.

Fadal received a Broadcast Journalism award by the National Air Disaster Foundation in 2004 [NADF] post-9/11, for contributions leading to improved aviation safety. Fadal was named the University of South Florida Outstanding Young Alumnus of 2004, University of South Florida AlumNews, October 2004.

She has won several local Emmy awards. In 2016, Fadal received the Ellis Island Medal of Honor, an American award founded by the Ellis Island Honors Society (EIHS) (formerly known as National Ethnic Coalition of Organizations (NECO)). In 2015, Fadal was named a “Power Woman”. In 2014 she was selected to receive the Soldiers’, Sailors’, Marines’, Coast Guard and Airmen's Club Media Award for her coverage of the war in Afghanistan.

Fadal covered the history-making appearance of Hamilton in Puerto Rico in 2019 after Hurricane Maria devastated the island nation.

Midlife & Menopause on TikTok 
In 2020, Fadal began to share her experiences as a woman in midlife on her podcast, Coming Up Next, and on social media. She gained popularity on TikTok in 2022 candidly sharing her menopause experience on the app.

Publications
 Why Hasn't He Called? (2007) 
 Why Hasn't He Proposed? (2008) 
 The New Single (2015)

Advocacy
Fadal is active in the fight against breast cancer. After losing her mother to the disease in 1990, she continues to be involved with the Avon 39 Walk To End Breast Cancer. She also lends her support to SHARE Cancer Support. She serves on the advisory board for Let's Talk Menopause   helping advocate for menopause awareness.
Fadal is Honorary Vice Chair  of Adapt Community Network, formerly United Cerebral Palsy of New York City. Fadal is a celebrity ambassador for Northshore Animal League   Fadal works with Best Buddies International, a nonprofit organization dedicated to establishing a global volunteer movement that creates opportunities for one-to-one friendships, integrated employment and leadership development for people with intellectual and developmental disabilities (IDD).

Awards
2013 Regional Emmy award On-Camera Talent: Anchor- News Tamsen Fadal.  July 17, 2013. (WPIX-TV). “Composite.” 
2013 Regional Emmy award Remembering Mayor Ed Koch. February 1, 2013. (WPIX-TV). Tamsen Fadal, Anchor; Marvin Scott, Mary Murphy, Reporters; Jay Dow, Correspondent.
2015 nominated for the Regional Emmy award Outstanding Regional News Story – Spot News - Metro-North Train Derailment - (WPIX-TV) Anchors - Tamsen Fadal, Scott Stanford 
2016 Fadal received the Ellis Island Medal of Honor, an American award founded by the Ellis Island Honors Society (EIHS)
2018 Regional Emmy award for Talent: Anchor - News" (WPIX-TV) 
2018 Regional Emmy award for Reporter: News Special - Unrest in America, January 29, 2017. (WPIX-TV)
2018 Regional Emmy award for Talent: Commentator/Editorialist/Program Host/Moderator 
2019 Fadal honored with the Ackerman Family Advocate Award

See also
 New Yorkers in journalism

References

External links

Tamsen Fadal Official Site
Tamsen Fadal PIX11 Bio
Macmillan Speakers Bureau
Tamsen Fadal Author Profile
Shansen Jewelry

American television journalists
Philadelphia television reporters
New York (state) television reporters
Television anchors from New York City
American people of Arab descent
American people of Lebanese descent
Living people
University of South Florida alumni
Regional Emmy Award winners
1970 births